AIM Academy North London is a mixed secondary school and sixth form located in the Edmonton area of the London Borough of Enfield, England.

Originally known as Cuckoo Hall Secondary Modern school, it merged with the Houndsfield and Eldon secondary modern schools to become Mandeville Secondary Comprehensive School in 1967, becoming Salisbury School and then Turin Grove School. The school reopened in 2010 as Nightingale Academy; Nightingale was one of the first Mayor's academies to be established in London. The school became AIM North London Academy in 2019, and is sponsored by the AIM Academies Trust.

AIM Academy North London offers GCSEs as programmes of study for pupils, while sixth form students can choose to study from a range of A Levels.

In October 2018, the Principal Ann Palmer was absent from the academy whilst Interim Executive Principal Mr Remo Iafrate from nearby AET school Aylward, took over the day-to-day running of the school. In April 2019 it was announced that Catherine Hutley would take over as Interim Headteacher until the end of the academic year. From September 2019, the Headmaster was Paddy McGrath.

Lineage

Notes and references

External links
AIM Academy North London official website

Secondary schools in the London Borough of Enfield
Academies in the London Borough of Enfield
Edmonton, London